The River Nene ( or : see below) is a river in the east of England that rises from three sources in Northamptonshire.

Etymology and pronunciation
Spelling of the river's name has altered over time; it was called the "Nenn" or "Nyn" in an 1810 engraving by draughtsmen George Cole and John Roper, while the Ordnance Survey of 1885 used what has since become standard spelling, "Nene". The origin and meaning of the River Nene's name is unknown. The earliest known examples, which date back to the 10th century AD, have been linked to Indo-European root words for snow, rain, or washing, but a direct connection is purely speculative. According to the British toponymist and medieval scholar Victor Watts, "The name is certainly pre-English, possibly pre-Celtic'. The same name appears in the Neen, the former name of the River Rea in Shropshire, which is retained in the hamlet of Neen Savage.

The pronunciation of the river's name varies by locality. In Northampton it is usually pronounced  ("Nen"), and around Peterborough it is usually pronounced  ("Neen"). The point at which the pronunciation of the Nene changes has been moving further inland for many years; the current edition of the nautical publisher Imray's "Map Of The River Nene" suggests that it now begins at Thrapston.

Course
The River Nene is the tenth-longest river in the United Kingdom. The final  from Northampton to the Wash is navigable.

The river's most westerly source can be found near the village of Badby, near Daventry. On the eastern slopes of Arbury Hill, and in pools between Arbury Hill and Sharmans Hill, are two tributaries that converge at Dodford Mill to form the upper reaches of the Daventry Nene. The northern stream flows by the villages of Badby and Newnham to the confluence, whilst the southerly stream runs through Fawsley Park and past the village of Everdon before the confluence. From Dodford, the river passes through the village of Weedon where it flows under the main west coast railway line, the Grand Union Canal, and Watling Street. A little west of Weedon, the river converges with a further northerly tributary arising at Nenmoor Spring to the northwest of West Haddon. The river then flows towards Northampton, passing Flore and Nether Heyford, where it is joined by small streams on either bank. A little past Bugbrooke Mill, the Nene passes under the M1 motorway and falls over a weir towards Kislingbury.

Another tributary merges from the south at Kislingbury. The Nene's course is closely followed by the Grand Union Canal's Northampton arm at Upton Mill.

Northampton
At Upton Mill, another tributary, called Wootton Brook, joins the river from the south. The River Nene now approaches Northampton town from the west, passing between the suburbs of St James (locally known as Jimmy's End), Cotton End and Far Cotton. The Nene's third northern source, the Naseby Source or Brampton Nene, converges at the Carlsberg Brewery. This tributary flows through the north of Northampton where several streams join. Three of these streams supply water for reservoirs at Pitsford, Hollowell and Ravensthorpe, north of Northampton, before joining the Brampton Nene. At Cotton End, the Nene passes under South Bridge, then through Beckett's Park and past the site of the former Northampton Power Station in the Nunn Mills area of the town, on the south bank of the river opposite Midsummer Meadow on the north banks. Northampton Sea Cadets is based in Nunn Mills, and uses the river for the training of boating skills, following the training schemes of the Royal Yachting Association (RYA) and the British Canoe Union (BCU). A short way downstream, a weir can divert some of the Nene's flow to supply the Nene Whitewater Centre.

The River Nene at Northampton was the location of England's first water-powered cotton spinning mill. It was installed on the site of a former corn mill, to the south-west of the town centre, in 1742.

Nene Valley
From Northampton, the river flows along a broad valley, formed by the enormous amount of water released by the melting ice during the Ice Age, towards the east coast. The Nene now meanders through this wide, flat valley with flood plains, lakes, pools and mature gravel pits on either bank, a byproduct of the large glacial deposits in the valley. At Great Billing is Billing Aquadrome, a popular caravan and camping park with leisure facilities and a funfair, which is based around the river and various mature gravel pits. The park is popular with fishermen and water skiers alike. The river's landscape is now dominated by mature gravel pit lakes. Some gravel extraction still takes place along the valley's basin. At Cogenhoe (pronounced  locally) the river passes through a watermill. The mill is a red-brick building built in the late nineteenth century, with a slate roof, from which all the machinery has been removed. Adjacent is a Mill House, built of coursed limestone rubble, and dated 1725. At Earls Barton the river again passes an area of mature gravel pit lakes, and lock gates numbers 9 and 10. Further on, the river passes through Doddington Lock No 11 and the nearby Hardwater Watermill. This watermill, mentioned in the Domesday Book, ground wheat into flour for almost 1000 years. Thomas Becket, Archbishop of Canterbury, used the mill as a hiding place after escaping from Northampton Castle in 1164 and fleeing down the Nene to be sheltered by the miller before fleeing to France. The watermill ceased grinding flour after the Second World War. The present buildings date from the late eighteenth and early nineteenth centuries, and have been converted into dwellings.

Wellingborough

The river's course turns to the north-east, 
passing the town of Wellingborough on its north bank and the village of Little Irchester to the south. At Wellingborough, the river passes through Victoria Mills. Founded in 1886 by the Whitworth family, they are still run by the firm today, producing fine flours for the bakery trade. In front of the mill, there remains a jetty from the days when the river was used for transportation of goods to and from the mills. A little further on, the river is joined from the north by the River Ise. On the opposite bank are the remains of the Roman town of Irchester. The river now passes under a viaduct that carries the Midland Main Line, which links London St Pancras International to Sheffield Midland station in northern England via Luton, Bedford, Kettering, Leicester, Derby, Nottingham and Chesterfield.

Passing Irthlingborough on its north-western bank, the Nene now flows past the demolished Nene Park, one of the former grounds of Kettering Town F.C. Further on, the river is crossed by the disused track bed of the Northampton and Peterborough Railway which was constructed in 1845. The river is now characterised by large curving meanders as it passes the villages of Little Addington, Great Addington, Woodford and Denford.

Thrapston

At Denford the river divides into two channels, one of which is used for navigation. The channels approach the town of Thrapston, passing under two adjacent viaducts. One carries the busy A14 trunk road; the other carries the disused railway track bed. Between the town of Thrapston and the village of Islip, the Nene is spanned by a low nine-arched bridge. The reserve, designated in 1989, consists of two lakes, a woodland, river banks and areas of grass and scrub in which some ponds have been dug. The reserve is operated by Northamptonshire County Council, with the approval of the Nature Conservancy Council. At Aldwincle another tributary, called Harpers Brook, joins the Nene from the north-west. Harpers Brook flows between gravel pit lagoons before converging with the river. The river flows south of Oundle passing Barnwell Country Park and Oundle Marina under a bridge of the A605 road. At , the Romans bridged the river with Ermine Street in the first century. Between Oundle marina and Peterborough the Nene falls towards Peterborough, navigation passing through 11 locks on the way.

Peterborough

Having passed among the gentle hills of Northamptonshire the river enters the rural part of the City of Peterborough, passing the Nene Valley Railway and through the Nene Valley Country Park.  upstream of the city centre is Woodston Wharf—the site of the old sea lock—originally the extent of the tidal River Nene until the Dog-in-a-Doublet lock at Whittlesey was opened in 1937. To the east of Peterborough city centre a branch of the river passes under the former Great Eastern Railway, now connected to the main East Coast main line and running through to Cambridge via Whittlesey and Ely. The branch terminates, for navigation, at Stanground Lock, a connection to the Middle Levels, the drainage system of the Fens through which access is possible to the River Great Ouse.

Continuing downstream leads to the impressive 'Embankment' area and after the cathedral city itself, passing through Whittlesey the landscape changes to the Nene Washes in The Fens and their vast horizons. Beyond Flag Fen the river flows under the A47 bridge at Guyhirn, through the port of Wisbech, then Sutton Bridge in Lincolnshire, and it finally enters The Wash between two towers known as "the lighthouses".

The Nene links the Grand Union Canal to the River Great Ouse, via the Middle Level Navigations. Much of its route has been upgraded to a wide canal with locks at regular intervals. Some sections where artificial cuts run adjacent to the course of the river are known as the "Nene Navigation".

Navigation

The Nene is navigable from just above its junction with the Northampton Arm of the Grand Union Canal to the sea. Most leisure use is between Northampton and Peterborough, where it makes a junction with the Middle Level Navigations at Stanground Sluice, which give access to the River Ouse. There is no longer any significant commercial traffic above the Port of Wisbech.

Above Peterborough

The first recorded attempts to improve the upper river for navigation occurred in 1567 and 1606, when the people of Northampton commissioned surveys. In 1653, a printed pamphlet suggested that 33 locks to bypass the mills could be built for £8,000, to make the river navigable. Eventually, an Act of Parliament was obtained in 1713, which appointed large numbers of Commissioners, but stated that work could only proceed if any nine of them could find someone to make the entire river navigable. No-one was prepared to take on the task, although it appears from the Act that the river was navigable from Peterborough to Alwalton at the time. The Act was superseded by a second one obtained in 1724, which allowed the river to be improved in stages, the work to be carried out at the contractor's expense, with the cost to be recouped from tolls. Robert Wright and Thomas Squire agreed to these terms for the section from Peterborough to the bridge at Oundle North in September 1726, and completed the work by 1730. Squire then agreed to the same terms for the next section to Thrapston in 1736, and completed it by late 1737. This part of the river was then designated as the Eastern Division.

A failure to find anyone prepared to work on the Western Division from Thrapston to Northampton resulted in a third Act being obtained in 1756, which allowed the Commissioners to borrow money to finance the work. Lenders would become Proprietors of the Navigation, and the work was to begin at Thrapston and extend the navigable section towards Northampton. It took the Commissioners two years to agree who should carry out the work, but on 22 June 1758, John Smith jnr from Attercliffe, Yorkshire was contracted to construct 20 pound locks, 20 horse haling bridges and various other works at a cost of £14,070. The river opened to navigation in stages over the next three years, with a great celebration being held at Northampton on 7 August 1761 when the work was completed.

The proprietors had the right to use tolls as they saw fit, and the Commissioners found that they had no powers to ensure the navigation was maintained in good order. They obtained another Act of Parliament in 1794, which aimed to rectify the situation, but it was not until 1801 that Thomas Wright replied to their requests, and some repairs were made. There was little traffic and income from tolls was low, at just £488 per year between 1801 and 1804. The Commissioners were also keen to see a link constructed from Northampton to the Grand Junction Canal, but the canal company argued that there was an insufficient supply of water. It was agreed that a link would be built in two halves, but that there would be  of railway in the middle. When built, the canal company constructed the entire link as a railway, which opened in 1805. In a bid to get a navigable link, the Commissioners opposed the bill to build a link between the Grand Junction Canal and the Old Union Canal, but relented when they had a firm agreement that a navigable link to Northampton would be built. The link cost £35,000, was supervised by Benjamin Bevan, and was built between 1812 and 1815.

Tolls rose to a little over £1,000 per year, but the Commissioners decided that the canal boats damaged the locks, and all traffic had to be transferred to river barges. This order was withdrawn in 1827, but the condition of the river gradually deteriorated, and the arrival of the Blisworth to Peterborough Railway in 1845 further reduced profitability. Flooding was also a problem, but the Commissioners had no powers to act as Commissioners of Sewers, to address the problems of drainage. With serious flooding in December 1848, a public meeting was held, and a committee was elected to consider Nene drainage. The main problem was a restriction at Wisbech, and the engineer James Rendel estimated that £120,000 was required to reconstruct the river below Peterborough. The Nene Valley Drainage and Improvement Act was obtained in 1852, to allow this work to be completed.

Below Peterborough
Below Peterborough, the river meandered to Tydd Gote, where it shared an outfall to the Wash with the River Great Ouse. Once the latter was diverted to Bishop's Lynn in 1236, the Nene outfall deteriorated. Navigation was improved in the 1470s when Morton's Leam, a straight channel between Peterborough and Wisbech, was constructed by Bishop Morton. It was improved in 1570 and 1631.
In 1631 a sluice was built at Wisbech by Vermuyden.

Morton's Leam was largely superseded by Smith's Leam, a straight cut from Peterborough to Guyhirn made by the Bedford Level Corporation in 1728. In order to improve the mouth of the river, which followed a tortuous route through salt marshes, the construction of a new channel was proposed by Nathaniel Kinderley, and work started on it in 1721. It was nearly completed when Wisbech Corporation's support turned to opposition, and they destroyed the work. The cut was eventually completed in 1773, but was not long enough to be a complete success.
The Wisbech Canal, opened in 1797, joined the river at Wisbech, the canal was filled in during the 1960s.

Various proposals for improvements near Wisbech were made, notably in 1814 by John Rennie and again in 1821 by Thomas Telford, but all were opposed by Wisbech Corporation. An Act of Parliament was obtained in 1827 to enable the works and Wisbech contributed £30,000 to the project. The contractors for the new cut below Wisbech were Jolliffe and Banks, who charged £149,259 for the channel. Once the old channel was dammed up, the tidal scour in the new channel was sufficient to remove silt deposits, and large volumes of stone were needed to stabilise the banks.

The 1852 Drainage and Improvement Act gave the Commissioners wide powers to manage the river, but created an administrative structure that was too complex to be workable. With the river in a poor state, James Rendel was appointed as engineer, and began dredging the channel and raising the banks, which cost £124,000. Another Act of Parliament was obtained in 1854, to allow the Commissioners to borrow £325,000 to pay for the work. A new iron swing bridge was built in Wisbech, to replace a narrow stone bridge which restricted the flow of the river, and although it was tested on installation, it was not operated subsequently. In 1856 a very high tide came within two feet of the newly installed pilings. Dams across the river were built at Waldersea and Guyhirn, and an underwater weir was constructed below the bridge at Wisbech. Wisbech Corporation took the Commissioners to court in 1859 for obstructing the river, and when an initial judgement was made in their favour, gangs of men destroyed most of the Waldersea dam overnight. An appeal to the Court of Chancery by the Commissioners also failed, and the dams were removed, as was the Wisbech weir, after an accident involving a train of lighters.

Navigation was always hampered by the Northey Gravel shoal near Dog-in-a-Doublet. Together with a sluice, this prevented salt water from entering the Thorney River, and the Duke of Bedford had obtained an injunction in 1865 to prevent interference with it. An appeal to have the injunction removed in 1880 failed. A dock covering  was built at Sutton Bridge at this time, but the outer wall collapsed on 9 June 1881, a few days before it was officially opened, and the estimated repair costs of £160,000 resulted in the project failing. Sporadic traffic managed to use the river, but its condition continued to deteriorate.
In 1893, a boating tragedy occurred near Sutton Bridge, in which 9 people died.

Reconstruction
By the time the Nene Catchment Board took control of the river, as a result of the passing of the Land Drainage Act (1930), the river was "in unparalleled decay and dilapidation". They rebuilt all of the locks, and replaced the remaining staunches with locks. A new lock and sluice were built at Dog-in-a-Doublet, to prevent salt water passing up the river, and to maintain water levels to Peterborough. The Thorney River was closed for navigation, arrangements were made for the supply of fresh water to the Thorney Estate, and the Northey Gravel shoal was blown up with dynamite. A new concrete bridge was built at Wisbech, at the time it was the largest portal bridge in the country, the span being 92.5 feet. The benefits of the new works were proved in the floods of 1947, when land bordering the Nene was not inundated.

The new locks resulted in some commercial traffic returning to the river. It also caters for smaller boats, with a major expansion of the facilities at the yacht harbour completed in May 2000.

Eagre 
In a lecture at Wisbech & Fenland Museum John Gardiner recalled seeing the rush of the tide below, and an 'eagre' or 'tidal bore', which was a great wave that came rolling up on the tide from the mouth of the Nene, one to four feet high in height. This ceased after the opening of a new cut.

Operation
All but a handful of the locks have conventional mitre gates at the upstream end and a single vertically lifting guillotine gate at the downstream end. This arrangement permits the use of the locks as additional weirs in time of flood, when the mitre gates are chained open and the guillotines lifted to allow the water to flow straight through. This precludes navigation at these times.

Traditionally the guillotines were manually operated by turning a large wheel some 150 times to raise or lower the gate; since the locks have to be left empty this operation will always have to be done twice to pass through. In recent years the Environment Agency, who are the navigation authority for the river, have been installing electric operation of the guillotines and in some cases replacing them altogether with mitre gates.

Flooding

January 1978 floods
On 11 and 12 January, the 1978 North Sea storm surge caused extensive coastal flooding. Higher water levels were reached than during the devastating North Sea flood of 1953. 
Flooding affected both banks of the river at Wisbech. A 70-year-old woman was reported drowned in her flooded home in Wisbech after the Nene burst its banks forcing 1000 people to evacuate their homes. Clarkson Geriatric Day Hospital was closed for weeks as repairs were made.

Easter 1998 floods
On 8 and 9 April 1998, constant torrential rain caused flooding across large parts of the English Midlands. On Good Friday, 10 April 1998, the floods peaked and many rivers burst their banks. The Nene was badly affected, flooding low-lying parts of Northampton, Wellingborough, Earls Barton and other settlements on its banks. The town centre of Northampton lies on the northern slope of the Nene Valley and escaped the river's flooding. However, the Cotton End, Far Cotton and St James End areas of the town occupy the flood plain and have borne the brunt of severe flooding over the years, culminating in the 1998 Easter floods. In 2002, a siren warning system was installed in Northampton to warn residents in the event of further flooding, and embankments and flood walls were bolstered to protect the town. In Kislingbury village, a flood alleviation scheme was completed in 2004.

In 2007, the Government announced it would spend £6 million on flood defences at Upton Mill in the west of Northampton; wetland areas and embankments were to be constructed along the river.

2013 flood 
In December 2013, the 2010 £12 million project to protect 10,590 residents and 1,200 businesses with an improved flood defence regime prevented another major incursion of water. The water came within inches of reaching the top of the flood walls and water poured across the roads near flood gates, bringing traffic on North End Road, Wisbech to a standstill.

The Nene in the arts
In 2016, composer, Benjamin Till was commissioned by NMPAT (Northamptonshire Music and Performing Arts Trust) to create a major orchestral and choral work about the Nene. The composition was scored for 800 musicians and premiered at the Royal Albert Hall in 2017, before being performed at Northampton's Derngate Theatre and Peterborough Cathedral. The piece quotes tradition folk melodies from towns and villages along the river, and explores ghost stories, myths and legends associated with the Nene.

Namesakes
The river gave its name to a boat Nene of Wisbech, one of whose crew was drowned in the river in 1830, the former football team Wisbech Nene Rovers, the former Nene College of Higher Education in Northampton, now the University of Northampton, the Nene derby, and also to the Rolls-Royce Nene turbojet engine, Rolls-Royce's practice being to name their gas turbine designs after British rivers. The river may also be linked to the fact that Sir Henry Royce was born in Alwalton, a village which is by the river, near Peterborough.
The former Nene Inn, Nene Parade, Wisbech were both named after the river. Nene Pet Supplies, Nene Quay, Wisbech are also both named after the river.

See also

Rivers of the United Kingdom
Association of Nene River Clubs
Nene Valley Colour Coated Ware
Nene Way long-distance footpath

References

Bibliography

External links 

 The Lost Port of Sutton

 
Rivers of Cambridgeshire
Rivers of Lincolnshire
Rivers of Norfolk
Rivers of Northamptonshire